The Master is an album by jazz guitarist Jimmy Raney that was released by Criss Cross Jazz in 1983. The CD release added two alternative takes.

Reception 

Ron Wynn of AllMusic states "A nice mid-'80s session with the relaxed, fluid guitar of Jimmy Raney ... He's supported with style by pianist Kirk Lightsey, who emerges as the date's other dominant solo voice".

Track listing 
 "The Song Is You" (Jerome Kern, Oscar Hammerstein II) – 5:52
 "Billie's Bounce" (Charlie Parker) – 6:28
 "Along Came Betty" (Benny Golson) – 6:16
 "Just One of Those Things" (Cole Porter) – 3:57
 "It's All Right With Me" (Cole Porter) – 8:19
 "Lament"(J. J. Johnson) – 7:54
 "Tangerine" (Victor Schertzinger, Johnny Mercer) – 6:54
 "The Song Is You" [alternate take] (Kern, Hammerstein) – 5:58 Bonus track on CD release
 "Tangerine" [alternate take] (Schertzinger, Mercer) – 6:48 Bonus track on CD release

Personnel 
Jimmy Raney – guitar
Kirk Lightsey – piano
Jesper Lundgaard – bass
Eddie Gladden – drums

References 

Jimmy Raney albums
1983 albums
Criss Cross Jazz albums